The 1986 Delaware 500 was a NASCAR Winston Cup Series racing event that was held on September 14, 1986, at Dover Downs International Speedway in Dover, Delaware.

The most dominant drivers in the NASCAR Winston Cup Series during the 1980s were Bill Elliott, Darrell Waltrip, Terry Labonte, Bobby Allison, and Dale Earnhardt.

Background
Dover Downs International Speedway, now called Dover International Speedway, is one of five short tracks to hold NASCAR races; the others are Bristol Motor Speedway, Richmond International Raceway, Martinsville Speedway, and Phoenix International Raceway. The track's turns are banked at twenty-four degrees, and both the front stretch (the location of the finish line) and the backstretch are banked at nine degrees.

Race report
There were 41 drivers who originally qualified for this race; only George Wiltshire failed to make the final 40-car starting grid. All but one of the drivers were born in the United States of America; Cliff Hucul was born in Canada.

This race lasted 500-laps or four hours and twenty-two minutes. Mike Potter was the first victim of engine failure on lap 22. Ricky Rudd finally gets a win on a big track, leading 141 laps en route to victory by defeating Neil Bonnet. Neil Bonnett scored his best result of the season so far in second, leading 12 laps. Buddy Baker scored his first of 5 straight top-5 finishes for the #88 team to close out the season, finishing a lap down in fourth. Alan Kulwicki recovered from an early crash and capitalized on attrition to finish in seventh, three laps off the pace. Bobby Hillin Jr. continued his methodical pace that had become custom throughout the season, finishing five laps down in ninth.

Morgan Shepherd had another strong run with the RahMoc #75, leading 36 laps but fading towards the end. He came home seven laps down in tenth. Richard Petty ran midpack much of the day, finishing seven laps down in twelfth. Rusty Wallace led 39 laps and ran with the leaders all day until a late crash knocked him out of contention. He would crawl home nine laps down in thirteenth. Darrell Waltrip struggled with mechanical issues all race, yet still finished ahead of his other title contenders in fourteenth, 10 laps off the pace. Buddy Arrington scored a second straight top-15 finish, coming home 16 laps down in fourteenth. Michael Waltrip never really recovered from an early spin, finishing sixteenth, 29 laps down.

Johnny Coy Jr. made his first start of the 1986 season in James Hylton's #48 entry. He was incredibly slow, finishing 31 laps down in seventeenth. This would ultimately be his best career finish. 
Joe Booher made his second start of the season in the #6 D.K. Ulrich entry. He was easily the slowest car on track, finishing 35 laps down in eighteenth. Dale Earnhardt was knocked out of contention by a late crash, finishing 68 laps down in twenty-first. He did manage to lead three laps, which was crucial in the points chase.

Rudd's Ford Thunderbird performed like a flawless machine from lap 200 to the checkered flag. Out of the 56 racing events that Ricky Rudd did at Dover International Speedway, his average start was 13th place while his average finish was 14th-place with four confirmed victories. Rudd was also proficient at the road courses in addition to Rockingham and Pocono.

Bobby Allison was stuck in the garage for many laps after an early crash, ultimately coming home 39 laps down in twentieth.

The pole position of the race would end up going to Geoffrey Bodine for travelling up to  during his solo qualifying runs. Tim Richmond ended up being the lowest-placed driver to actually make it through the race. Only Ricky Rudd, Neil Bonnett, and Kyle Petty would finish the race in the lead lap. Kyle Petty also surprised many with his strong third-place run; leading four laps in the process. Tommy Ellis turned in a solid run and finishes eighth, the second-best finish of his Cup career. This was his best run during his tenure in Eric Freedlander's #18 Freedlander Financial Chevrolet. ASA star Mark Martin made his third start of the 1986 season and scored his best finish in eleventh, 7 laps down.

Notable crew chiefs who actively participated in the race included Junie Donlavey, Robin Pemberton, Joey Arrington, Dale Inman, Larry McReynolds, Harry Hyde, Bud Moore, Kirk Shelmerdine among others.

Terry Labonte's led 85 laps and looked assured for a top-10 until a blown engine sidelined him after 461 laps. However, Labonte would have to earn this middle-of-the-road finish by dueling against Ricky Rudd for 138 laps. Bryan Baker, Roy Lee Hendrick, and Howard Rose would make their only appearances during this event. Cliff Hucul makes his second and final Cup series start and it results in the former USAC Champ Car racer's best finish with a 31st.

Winnings for this racing event varied from a then-awesome $51,500 ($ when adjusted for inflation) to a humble $850 ($ when adjusted for inflation). The total prize purse for this racing event totalled at exactly $314,000 ($ when adjusted for inflation).

Qualifying

Top 20 finishers

Standings after the race

References

Delaware 500
Delaware 500
NASCAR races at Dover Motor Speedway